The Water Tower in Simpelveld was built in 1929–1930 by the contractor Meijer from Voerendaal for the nearby miljoenenlijn railway. It has been a heritage site since 2001 (nr 518643) together with the railway turntable which is only a few meters removed.

A dividing wall splits it into two halves of  each. A heating system ensures that the tower does not freeze during the winter. 

The water tower was in function till 1954. Since then it has been in use for industrial purposes. In 2002 it received a large maintenance.

Water towers in the Netherlands
Towers in Limburg (Netherlands)
Rijksmonuments in Simpelveld
Towers completed in 1930